A ringlet is a type of hairstyle. Ringlets are often also known as princess curls or corkscrew curls. It is achieved by wrapping a lock of hair around the length of a thin curling iron or can be done naturally by people with sufficiently tightly curled hair. The curls can also be achieved by hair rollers. Loose ringlets can be created just by twisting wet hair as well.

Orthodox Jewish men wear payot, which may be curled as ringlets.

See also
 List of hairstyles

External links

Scalp hairstyles